Dee Whitcomb (born 1967) is a Native American artist.

Art
As a self taught artist, his earlier professional works generally focused on the plight of the American Indian. He changed styles after constant misunderstanding on the message behind his works. He also received numerous death threats after the publication of his painting titled We Died For Your Sins. Whitcomb's art has a strong emphasis on photorealism which can be seen throughout his works. He has had numerous solo art exhibitions including a one man art exhibition at Gallery La Luna in Wiesbaden, Germany. In 2007 he also took 3rd place for Art Scene Internationals ARNO award for best illustrator. In 2014, Whitcomb took best of show in the Artist Hanger and Fusion Project in New York City.

Tattoo
Whitcomb is also a tattoo artist, and founded Twisted Heart Tattoo and Gallery in Hollywood, Florida. He is also co-owner of Stahlwerk Tattoo in Aschaffenburg, Germany. Currently Whitcomb tattoos between Connecticut and New York. He has received dozens of awards worldwide for his tattoo work. Most recently, first place for best female back piece at the Cradle of Aviation United Ink tattoo convention in New York. Dee Whitcomb endorses and is sponsored by StarBrite Colors.

Personal life
After growing up in Connecticut, Whitcomb relocated to Miami, Florida where his professional art career began. In 1998, he traveled to Frankfurt, Germany where he subsequently resided moving to Northern Ireland in 2010. Currently, Whitcomb works in New York and Connecticut and resides in Connecticut with his wife, two children, a dog and a cat.

Publications
Dee Whitcomb has appeared in publications in the United States and Canada, as well as countries across Europe, including a book published in Japan.

References

1967 births
Living people
People from Connecticut
Lakota people
American pop artists
Photorealist artists
American tattoo artists
People from Miami